East Sandwich is a village and census-designated place (CDP) within the town of Sandwich in Barnstable County, Massachusetts, United States. The population was 3,940 at the 2010 census.

Geography
East Sandwich is located in the northeast portion of the town of Sandwich at  (41.737654, -70.423178). It is bordered by Cape Cod Bay to the north, the village of Sandwich to the west, U.S. Route 6 to the south, and the town of Barnstable to the east. The line between East Sandwich and Sandwich village is formed by Chipman Road, Crowell Road, Charles Street, and Water Street (Massachusetts Route 130). Massachusetts Route 6A is the main road through the community.

Demographics

As of the census of 2010, there were 3,940 people, 2,914 households, and 1,055 families residing in the CDP. The population density was 190.2/km2 (520.75/mi2). There were 2,044 housing units at an average density of 105.5/km2 (273.4/mi2). The racial makeup of the CDP was 98.68% White, 0.22% African American, 0.08% Native American, 0.35% Asian, 0.03% Pacific Islander, 0.22% from other races, and 0.43% from two or more races. Hispanic or Latino of any race were 0.67% of the population.

There were 1,466 households, out of which 29.5% had children under the age of 18 living with them, 64.3% were married couples living together, 6.1% had a female householder with no husband present, and 28.0% were non-families. 22.6% of all households were made up of individuals, and 9.3% had someone living alone who was 65 years of age or older. The average household size was 2.54 and the average family size was 3.02.

In the CDP, the population was spread out, with 23.7% under the age of 18, 5.0% from 18 to 24, 21.8% from 25 to 44, 33.9% from 45 to 64, and 15.6% who were 65 years of age or older. The median age was 45 years. For every 100 females, there were 94.2 males. For every 100 females age 18 and over, there were 90.8 males.

The median income for a household in the CDP was $66,318, and the median income for a family was $74,457. Males had a median income of $53,304 versus $36,042 for females. The per capita income for the CDP was $32,676. About 1.5% of families and 2.2% of the population were below the poverty line, including 4.0% of those under age 18 and 1.9% of those age 65 or over.

Notable residents 
 Dodge MacKnight (1860–1950), artist
 Peter Peltz (1915–2001), artist
 Tom Ellis (1932-2019), newscaster

References

Census-designated places in Barnstable County, Massachusetts
Census-designated places in Massachusetts
Populated coastal places in Massachusetts
Sandwich, Massachusetts